Frank Wallace may refer to:

 Frank Wallace (piper), Irish musician, 
 Frank Wallace (politician) (1861–1925), Australian politician
 Frank Wallace (gangster) (before 1910–1931), Irish-American gangster from South Boston
 Frank Wallace (soccer) (1922–1979), American soccer player, nicknamed "Pee Wee"
 Frank R. Wallace (1932–2006), author and philosopher
 G. Frank Wallace (1887–1964), New York state senator
 Frank Wallace, stage name for Frank Szatkus (born 1890/1891), vaudeville performer and first husband of Mae West